Natalia Efimova (born July 3, 1983) is a Russian orienteering competitor. She was member of the Russian relay team that received a silver medal in the 2008 European Orienteering Championships, together with Yulia Novikova and Tatiana Ryabkina. She competed at the 2008 World Orienteering Championships in Olomouc, where she qualified for the finals in the sprint and in the long distance.

Her husband Roman Efimov was a member of Russian national orienteering team.

References

External links
 
 Natalia Efimova at World of O Runners

1983 births
Living people
Russian orienteers
Female orienteers
Foot orienteers
21st-century Russian women